Phantasmarana lutzae is a species of frog in the family Hylodidae. It is endemic to Brazil and only known from its type locality in the Itatiaia National Park, Rio de Janeiro state. It is named in honor of Bertha Lutz, a Brazilian zoologist and feminist.

It was formerly placed in the genus Megaelosia, but was reclassified to Phantasmarana in 2021.

Description
Phantasmarana lutzae are relatively large frogs: two males in the type series measure  and a female  in snout–vent length. Dorsolateral skin has many large granules. The snout acuminate in dorsal view and rounded in profile. Canthus rostralis is evident and straight.

A single tadpole in Gosner stage 42 (towards the completion of metamorphosis) measured  in total length.

Habitat and conservation
The species' natural habitats are streams in primary forest. During daytime these frogs are found on emergent rocks in shallow places in streams. They lay the eggs under large rocks in moderately-sized forest streams.

The Itatiaia National Park is well protected, and there are no known significant threats to this species.

References

lutzae
Amphibians described in 1987
Endemic fauna of Brazil
Amphibians of Brazil
Taxa named by Eugênio Izecksohn
Taxonomy articles created by Polbot